Panam is a 1952 Indian Tamil-language film, directed by N. S. Krishnan. The film stars Sivaji Ganesan, N. S. Krishnan, B. R. Panthulu and Padmini. It was also the first of the many collbaborations between Ganesan and Padmini.

Cast 
Cast according to the opening credits

Male cast
 Sivaji Ganesan as Umapathy
 N. S. Krishnan as Durai
 B. R. Panthulu as Kanthasamy
 M. R. Saminathan
 V. K. Ramasamy as Gurunatha Pillai
 T. K. Ramachandran as Inspector Eswaran
 C. S. Pandian
 S. S. Rajendran as Sundaram
 K. A. Thangavelu as Aadiyapatham

Female cast
 Padmini as Jeeva
 T. A. Mathuram as Nallamma
 V. Susheela
 S. D. Subbulakshmi
 Chandra, Dhanam
Dance
 Girjia
 Ambujam
 Mohana

Soundtrack 
The music was composed by Viswanathan–Ramamoorthy. Lyrics by Pavendhar Barathidasan and Kannadasan. Singers are N. S. Krishnan, T. A. Madhuram & C. S. Pandian. Playback singers are C. S. Jayaraman, G. K. Venkatesh, M. L. Vasanthakumari, T. V. Rathnam & Radha Jayalakshmi.

References

External links 
 

1952 films
1950s Tamil-language films
Films scored by Viswanathan–Ramamoorthy
Films with screenplays by M. Karunanidhi